Pultneyville Historic District is a national historic district located at Pultneyville in Wayne County, New York.  The district includes 35 properties containing 33 contributing primary structures and 18 contributing outbuildings. It encompasses the historic core of Pultneyville.  Its earliest buildings are well crafted, modest to relatively sophisticated Federal and Greek Revival style dwellings built between about 1810 and 1850.

It was listed on the National Register of Historic Places in 1985.

References

Houses on the National Register of Historic Places in New York (state)
Historic districts on the National Register of Historic Places in New York (state)
Second Empire architecture in New York (state)
Federal architecture in New York (state)
Historic districts in Wayne County, New York
Houses in Wayne County, New York
National Register of Historic Places in Wayne County, New York